Phloretin is a dihydrochalcone, a type of natural phenol.  It can be found in apple tree leaves and the Manchurian apricot.

Metabolism 
In rats, ingested phlorizin is converted into phloretin by hydrolytic enzymes in the small intestine.  Phloretin hydrolase hydrolyses phloretin into phloretic acid and phloroglucinol.

Pharmacological research 
In an animal model, phloretin inhibited active transport of glucose into cells by SGLT1 and SGLT2, though the inhibition is weaker than by its glycoside phlorizin.  An important effect of this is the inhibition of glucose absorption by the small intestine and the inhibition of renal glucose reabsorption. Phloretin also inhibits a variety of urea transporters. It induces urea loss and diuresis when coupled with high protein diets.  Phloretin has been found to inhibit weight gain and improve metabolic homeostasis in mice fed with high-fat diet.  Phloretin inhibits aquaporin 9 (AQP9) on mouse hepatocytes.

Nanoparticle Synthesis 
Phloretin functionalized gold-nanoparticles (Pht-GNPs) were synthesized using a single-step synthesis method and tested for its anticancer activity. Pht-GNPs showed significant cancer cell toxicities compared to free phloretin.

Glycosides 
 Phlorizin is the 2'-glucoside of phloretin
 Naringin dihydrochalcone is a diglycoside of phloretin

See also 
 Phloretin-glucosidase

References 

Dihydrochalcones
3-Hydroxypropenals
Resorcinols